Pay Up may refer to:
 Pay Up (CSI: NY), an episode of the television series CSI: NY
 Pay Up (horse), a racehorse
 "Pay Up" (song), by American rapper Rhapsody